Alakamisy Marososona is a town and commune in Madagascar. It belongs to the district of Betafo, which is a part of Vakinankaratra region. The population of the commune was estimated 13,966 in 2018.

Primary and junior level secondary education are available in town. The majority 90% of the population of the commune are farmers, while an additional 10% receives their livelihood from raising livestock. The most important crops are rice and potatoes, while other important agricultural products are maize, barley and soya.

References and notes 

Populated places in Vakinankaratra